Jae-woo is a Korean masculine given name. The meaning differs based on the hanja used to write each syllable of the name. There are 26 hanja with the reading  "jae" and 60 hanja with the reading "woo" on the South Korean government's official list of hanja which may be registered for use in given names.

People with this name include:

Gwak Jae-u (1552–1617), Joseon Dynasty general
Lee Jae-woo (handballer) (born 1979), South Korean handball player
Lee Jae-woo (baseball) (born 1980), South Korean baseball player
Lee Jae-woo (badminton) (born 1992), South Korean badminton player
Bae Jae-woo (born 1993), South Korean football midfielder (K-League Classic)
Choi Jae-woo (born 1994), South Korean freestyle skier
Kim Jae-woo (born 1998), South Korean football defender (Austrian First League)

See also
List of Korean given names

References

Korean masculine given names